"Tell Me Why" is the second single of Echobelly's fourth album People Are Expensive. It reached 111 on the UK Singles Chart.

Track listing

Credits
Bass – James Harris
Drums – Andy Henderson 
Guitar – Glenn Johansson
Voice – Sonya Madan
Recorded by – Dick Meaney
Cover Art – Pascal Maillard
Producer – Echobelly (excluding "Tell Me Why", produced by Ben Hillier)

References

External links 
 http://www.discogs.com/Echobelly-Tell-Me-Why/release/1584812

2001 singles
Echobelly songs
2001 songs